The CCC Company 3767 Powder Magazine Historic District encompasses a pair of storage structures built by the Civilian Conservation Corps (CCC) in Ouachita National Forest.  It is located northwest of Jessieville, down a short abandoned roadway leading north from the junction of Gladstone Forest Road and Hampo Road.  The larger building, which housed explosives used in CCC construction projects, is a roughly  stone building, with a separate wall wrapping around its east side.  The smaller building, in which blasting caps were stored, is about  square stone structure, with a concrete top and floor.

The district was listed on the National Register of Historic Places in 2007.

See also
National Register of Historic Places listings in Garland County, Arkansas

References

Historic districts on the National Register of Historic Places in Arkansas
Ouachita National Forest
National Register of Historic Places in Garland County, Arkansas
Gunpowder magazines